The Rural Municipality of Kingsley No. 124 is a rural municipality (RM) in the Canadian province of Saskatchewan within Census Division No. 5 and  Division No. 1. It is located in the southeast portion of the province.

History 
The RM of Kingsley No. 124 incorporated as a rural municipality on December 12, 1910.

Heritage properties
There are three historical properties located within the RM.
Coronation Community Cairn - This commemorative monument built in 1978 recognizes the early pioneers in the region who helped build the one-room Coronation School in 1913.  The monument is located nine kilometers northeast of Windthorst.
Highland Baptist Church (previously called the Swedish Baptist Church) - This church was constructed in 1924 by early Swedish immigrants.  Regular services were held from 1924 until 1970.  The church still holds the occasional special service or event.  The church also has a cemetery on the property.  The building is located twelve kilometers north of the Town of Kipling.
Poplar Grove United Church - This church was constructed in 1902, and is located ten kilometers southeast of the Town of  Broadview.   The church is constructed of field stone and has nine stained-glass windows.  Regular services were held from 1902 until 1970.  The cemetery dates back to 1887.  Today the site is used for public events and the occasional special service.
Zion Lutheran Church - This country church was constructed in 1926, and is located  eight kilometers north of Windthorst.

Geography

Communities and localities 
The following urban municipalities are surrounded by the RM.

Towns
 Kipling

The following unincorporated communities are within the RM.

Localities
 Bender
 Inchkeith
 Neelby

Demographics 

Government 
The RM of Kingsley No. 124 is governed by an elected municipal council and an appointed administrator that meets on the second Tuesday of every month. The reeve of the RM is Gordon Sproat while its administrator is Holly Heikkila. The RM's office is located in Kipling.

Transportation 
Kipling Airport is located within the rural municipality.

References 

K

Division No. 5, Saskatchewan